Francis L. "Frank" Clarke (born 1933) is an Australian business economist, and Emeritus Professor of Accounting at University of Newcastle. He is best known for his 1997 publication of "Corporate collapse: Regulatory, accounting and ethical failure."

Clarke received his BEc and his PhD, and has been Professor of Accounting at University of Newcastle. After his retirement he was made Honorary Professor at the University of Sydney Business School. Clarke was former editor of Abacus, and co-author of The Routledge Companion to Accounting History, and the History of accounting: An international Encyclopedia.

Selected publications 
 Clarke, Frank L., and Graeme W. Dean. Contributions of Limperg and Schmidt to the Replacement Cost Debate in the 1920s. Garlan, 1990.
 Clarke, F. L., Dean, G. W., Oliver, K. G., & Clarke, F. L. (1997). Corporate collapse: Regulatory, accounting and ethical failure. Cambridge: Cambridge University Press.

Articles, a selection:
 Clarke, Frank L., and Graeme W. Dean. "Schmidt's Betriebswirtschaft theory." Abacus 22.2 (1986): 65–102.
 Craig, Russell J., Frank L. Clarke, and Joel H. Amernic. "Scholarship in university business schools-Cardinal Newman, creeping corporatism and farewell to the “disturber of the peace”?." Accounting, Auditing & Accountability Journal 12.5 (1999): 510-524.
 Walker, R. G., Frank L. Clarke, and G. W. Dean. "Reporting on the state of infrastructure by local government." Accounting, Auditing & Accountability Journal 12.4 (1999): 441–459.
 Walker, Robert G., Frank L. Clarke, and Graeme W. Dean. "Options for infrastructure reporting." Abacus 36.2 (2000): 123–159.
 Dean, Graeme W., and Frank L. Clarke. "An evolving conceptual framework?." Abacus 39.3 (2003): 279–297.

References

External links 
 Frankk Clark at University of Sydney

1933 births
Living people
Australian economists
Australian business theorists
Accounting academics
Academic staff of the University of Newcastle (Australia)
Academic staff of the University of Sydney